

The Alabatros W.5 was a floatplane torpedo bomber used by Germany during World War I. It was a biplane with twin pusher engines.

Operators

Imperial German Navy

Specifications (W.5)

See also

References

 

W.5
1910s German bomber aircraft
Floatplanes
Twin-engined pusher aircraft
Biplanes
Aircraft first flown in 1917